Ellerslie-Bideford was a municipality that held community status in Prince Edward Island, Canada. It was located in Prince County on Lot 12.

Most residents of Ellerslie-Bideford lived on Ellerslie Road (Route 133) which spans 5 miles from Route 2 to Route 12.

History 
The community was incorporated by provincial government in 1977, when Ellerslie merged with Bideford. Ellerslie was founded in 1853 by a local carpenter, being named after Ellerslie, Scotland. Bideford was named in 1818 after Bideford, Devon, England. Ellerslie is currently one of the last communities in the West Prince district of Prince Edward Island prior to the border with East Prince.

The community had a rich history in the fox farming and ship building industries. The Bideford Shipyard launched several sea vessels, including the last one to be christened there, the Meteor. Bideford is also home to a Shellfish Museum; as the fishery is the basis of the local economy.

Over the past several years, the Community Improvement Council (or CIC) has endeavored to undertake several infrastructure projects.  These projects include a new set of Soccer Fields and a Running Track.  The Council also attempted to move the community towards a central sewer system from the current model of independent septic tanks for each dwelling, however this motion was defeated in a community vote, over much controversy.

On September 28, 2018, the municipality was combined with Lady Slipper, to create the new municipality of Central Prince.

Education 
Ellerslie was home to Ellerslie Elementary School, which has approximately 200 students in grades K-6.  From this school, area residents go to Hernewood Intermediate, and Westisle Composite High.

Attractions 
Bideford Parsonage Museum
The Bideford Shellfish Museum

See also 
List of communities in Prince Edward Island
Summerside
Charlottetown
Tignish

References 

Government of PEI Municipality Information

External links 
Government of PEI Profile
Epodunk Canada Profile

Communities in Prince County, Prince Edward Island
Former rural municipalities in Prince Edward Island
Populated places established in 1901
Populated places disestablished in 2018